Kolos may refer to:

People
Kolos (name), a first or last name

Sports
Kolos (sports society), a Ukrainian sports society
Kolos Stadium (Borispil), a multifunctional stadium in Boryspil, Ukraine
FC Kolos Bykovo, a soccer team based in Bykovo, Volgograd Oblast, Russia
FC Kolos Kovalivka, a soccer team based in Kovalivka, Kyiv Oblast, Ukraine
FC Kolos Krasnodar, a soccer team based in Krasnodar, Russia
FC Kolos Pokrovskoye, a soccer team based in Pokrovskoye, Rostov Oblast, Russia
FC Kolos Nikopol, name of FC Elektrometalurh-NZF Nikopol, a soccer team based in Nikopol, Ukraine, in 1970–1991
FC Kolos Pavlohrad, former name of FC Kosmos Pavlohrad, a former soccer team based in Pavlohrad, Ukraine
FC Kolos Poltava, former name of FC Vorskla Poltava, a soccer team based in Poltava, Ukraine
FC Kolos Ustye, name of FC Stroitel Vitebsk, a soccer team based in Vitebsk, Belarus, in 1989–1993

Other
KOLOS, concrete armor units developed in India for coastal structures
Kolos (rural locality), several rural localities in Russia
Kołos Medal, a Polish medal awarded for achievements in chemistry

See also
Kolo (disambiguation)